Willow Shade, also known as the Willa Cather House, is a historic home located near Winchester, Frederick County, Virginia. The house was built in 1851, and is a two-story, five-bay-by-three-bay, rectangular brick dwelling in a vernacular Late Greek Revival style. It has a three bay by two bay rear ell.  The house sits on an English basement.  It was the childhood home of author Willa Cather (1873–1947) and was built by her grandfather, William Cather.  She was born at the nearby Willa Cather Birthplace and resided at Willow Shade from 1874 to 1883 before moving to Nebraska.

It was listed on the National Register of Historic Places in 1990.

See also
 National Register of Historic Places listings in Frederick County, Virginia

References

External links
 

Greek Revival houses in Virginia
Houses completed in 1851
Houses in Frederick County, Virginia
Houses on the National Register of Historic Places in Virginia
National Register of Historic Places in Frederick County, Virginia
Willa Cather
1851 establishments in Virginia